Cannabis in the Netherlands is illegal, but is decriminalised for personal use. Recreational consumption of the drug is tolerated, and it is available in coffeeshops.

Prohibition
Cannabis was first criminalised in the Netherlands in 1953, following earlier laws against its import and export in 1928. Cannabis was banned much earlier in the Dutch colony of Suriname, in the early part of the 20th century, and in Dutch Indonesia in 1927.

Loosening
In 1972, the Dutch government divided drugs into more- and less-dangerous categories, with cannabis being in the lesser category. Accordingly, possession of 30 grams or less was made a misdemeanor.

Coffeeshops

Cannabis has been available for recreational use in coffee shops since 1976. Cannabis products are only sold openly in certain local "coffeeshops" and possession of up to 5 grams for personal use is decriminalised, however, the police may still confiscate it, which often happens in car checks near the border. Other types of sales and transportation are not permitted, although the general approach toward cannabis was lenient even before official decriminalisation.

Though retail sales are tolerated, production, transportation, and bulk possession of marijuana outside of retail stores is illegal, preventing testing for contaminants and dosing. After legalization and regulation of the entire supply chain in other countries, some cities in the Netherlands are participating in a pilot project using officially approved growers and testers, and labeling of the amount of THC.

Medical marijuana
Since 2003, there has been a legal prescription drug known as "Mediwiet", available at Dutch pharmacies. There are five different types of medical cannabis in the Netherlands; the fifth contains Cannabidiol and almost no Tetrahydrocannabinol.

See also
 Drug policy of the Netherlands

References

External links